The Red Cape, also sometimes known as Madame Monet or The Red Kerchief, is an oil-on-canvas snowscape by French impressionist Claude Monet. The painting depicts Claude Monet's wife, Camille, passing outside of a window dressed in a red cape.

Monet painted the painting while living in Argenteuil. The solitary setting at his home there allowed him to paint in relative peace, as well as spend time with his family. It is Monet's only known snowscape painting that features Camille Monet. It is exhibited in the Cleveland Museum of Art, Cleveland, Ohio.

See also
List of paintings by Claude Monet

External links 
Page for The Red Cape on the Cleveland Museum of Art's collection database

References

Paintings by Claude Monet
1870s paintings
Paintings in the collection of the Cleveland Museum of Art